Gokarna Road railway station is a station on Konkan Railway. It is at a distance of  down from origin. The preceding station on the line is Ankola railway station and the next station is Kumta railway station.

The distance between Gokarna Road and Kumta railway stations of 19 km is the longest on the 741 km Konkan Railway line as on April, 2016. The Gokarna Road Railway station serves nearby Hindu (Sanatana) holy town Gokarna, Karnataka.

References 

Railway stations along Konkan Railway line
Railway stations in Uttara Kannada district
Karwar railway division